Montario Hardesty (born February 1, 1987), is an American football coach and former player. He is currently the running backs coach at the University of South Carolina. Hardesty played college football at the University of Tennessee, where he amassed fewer than 400 yards in each of his first four seasons before breaking out with 1,345 yards and 13 rushing touchdowns in 2009. In 2015, Hardesty became the running backs coach and special teams coordinator for Norfolk State University. He was the wide receivers coach for the Charlotte 49ers football program from 2019 to 2020.

High school career
Hardesty played football at New Bern High School. As a senior in 2004, he rushed for 2,002 yards on 272 carries. He had 19 rushing touchdowns. He was considered a four-star recruit and ranked 100th on the Rivals.com's list of the top 100 players in the class of 2005. He was recruited as an "athlete", with the potential to play both running back and safety. He was recruited and offered a scholarship by the University of Nebraska, University of North Carolina, North Carolina State University, Notre Dame, Ohio State University, University of South Carolina, and Virginia Tech. However, he chose to play for Tennessee.

College career
Hardesty was a three-year letter winner at Tennessee. He amassed 2,391 rushing yards on 560 attempts, 405 receiving yards on 38 receptions, and 26 total touchdowns.

Hardesty was granted a medical hardship for the 2005 season because of a knee injury he suffered against Ole Miss. He rushed 6 times for 18 yards before his injury. In 2006, Hardesty started off the season with a 43-yard touchdown run against the University of California. His best game of the season was a 74-yard performance against the Air Force Academy. He played in 13 games, starting 5 of them. He finished the season with 384 rushing yards and 4 touchdowns.

Hardesty's 2007 season wasn't quite as good as his 2006 season. He had a touchdown in the opening game of the season against the University of California once again. He finished the year with 373 rushing yards and 3 touchdowns.  2008 was the worst statistical season of Hardesty's career at Tennessee. He ran for 271 yards, finishing the season with 6 touchdowns. He passed the 1,000 career rushing yard mark against Vanderbilt University in the season's next-to-last game.

In 2009, Hardesty was 20th in the NCAA's Division I-FBS division in rushing yards, with 1345 yards in 13 games. He started the season off with 160 rushing yards and 1 touchdown against Western Kentucky University. He has passed the 100 rushing yard mark four more times in the 2009 season, against Ohio University,  the University of South Carolina, Vanderbilt University, and the University of Kentucky. He was the Southeastern Conference's fourth leading rusher in the 2009 season with 1,345 yards. Hardesty was first in the SEC in carries(282att.).

Statistics

Track and field
Hardesty was also an standout athlete at New Bern High School. He was a state 100 meters finalist in 2003. He decided not to run track and field at the University of Tennessee. His personal bests are 10.36 seconds in the 100 meters and 21.65 seconds in the 200 meters.

Personal bests

Professional career

2010 NFL Draft
Hardesty was picked in the 2nd round of the 2010 NFL Draft by the Cleveland Browns. Hardesty was expected to compete for the starting running back position for the Browns, but was limited in pre-season due to injury.  On September 2, in his first pre-season game against the Chicago Bears, he  suffered a torn left ACL, sidelining him for the entire 2010 season.

2013 season
On August 27, 2013, Hardesty was placed on injured reserve, effectively ending his 2013 NFL season.  He was released on September 30, 2013.

References

External links
 Cleveland Browns bio
 Tennessee Volunteers bio

1987 births
Living people
American football running backs
Cleveland Browns players
Players of American football from North Carolina
Sportspeople from New Bern, North Carolina
Tennessee Volunteers football players